Events in the year 2013 in Japan.

Incumbents 
Emperor: Akihito
Prime Minister: Shinzō Abe (L–Yamaguchi)
Chief Cabinet Secretary: Yoshihide Suga (L–Kanagawa)
Chief Justice of the Supreme Court: Hironobu Takesaki
 President of the House of Representatives: Bunmei Ibuki (L–Kyoto)
 President of the House of Councillors: Kenji Hirata (D–Gifu) until July 28, Masaaki Yamazaki from August 2
Diet sessions: 183rd (regular, January 28 to June 26), 184th (extraordinary, August 2 to August 7), 185th (extraordinary, October 15 to December 8)

Governors
Aichi Prefecture: Hideaki Omura
Akita Prefecture: Norihisa Satake
Aomori Prefecture: Shingo Mimura
Chiba Prefecture: Kensaku Morita
Ehime Prefecture: Tokihiro Nakamura
Fukui Prefecture: Issei Nishikawa 
Fukuoka Prefecture: Hiroshi Ogawa
Fukushima Prefecture: Yūhei Satō 
Gifu Prefecture: Hajime Furuta
Gunma Prefecture: Masaaki Osawa 
Hiroshima Prefecture: Hidehiko Yuzaki
Hokkaido: Harumi Takahashi
Hyogo Prefecture: Toshizō Ido
Ibaraki Prefecture: Masaru Hashimoto 
Ishikawa Prefecture: Masanori Tanimoto
Iwate Prefecture: Takuya Tasso
Kagawa Prefecture: Keizō Hamada
Kagoshima Prefecture: Satoshi Mitazono 
Kanagawa Prefecture: Yuji Kuroiwa
Kochi Prefecture: Masanao Ozaki 
Kumamoto Prefecture: Ikuo Kabashima
Kyoto Prefecture: Keiji Yamada 
Mie Prefecture: Eikei Suzuki
Miyagi Prefecture: Yoshihiro Murai
Miyazaki Prefecture: Shunji Kōno
Nagano Prefecture: Shuichi Abe
Nagasaki Prefecture: Hōdō Nakamura 
Nara Prefecture: Shōgo Arai
Niigata Prefecture: Hirohiko Izumida 
Oita Prefecture: Katsusada Hirose
Okayama Prefecture: Ryuta Ibaragi
Okinawa Prefecture: Hirokazu Nakaima
Osaka Prefecture: Ichirō Matsui
Saga Prefecture: Yasushi Furukawa 
Saitama Prefecture: Kiyoshi Ueda 
Shiga Prefecture: Yukiko Kada 
Shiname Prefecture: Zenbe Mizoguchi
Shizuoka Prefecture: Heita Kawakatsu
Tochigi Prefecture: Tomikazu Fukuda
Tokushima Prefecture: Kamon Iizumi
Tokyo: Naoki Inose (until 24 December); Tatsumi Ando (starting 24 December)
Tottori Prefecture: Shinji Hirai
Toyama Prefecture: Takakazu Ishii 
Wakayama Prefecture: Yoshinobu Nisaka
Yamagata Prefecture: Mieko Yoshimura 
Yamaguchi Prefecture: Tsugumasa Muraoka
Yamanashi Prefecture: Shōmei Yokouchi

Events 

January – January 2013 Northwest Pacific bomb cyclone causes 1,600 injuries across Japan.
March 17 – Chiba gubernatorial election – Kensaku Morita retains governorship of prefecture.
April 28 – By-election for House of Councillors in Yamaguchi – Kiyoshi Ejima is elected to the House.
June to October – 2013 Japanese heatwave, according to Ministry of Health, Labour and Welfare official confirmed report, 1,077 person lost to lives, caused by heat stroke, second worst heatwave disaster in Japan.        
June 16 – Shizuoka gubernatorial election – Heita Kawakatsu re-elected.
June 23 – Tokyo legislative election – The Democratic Party of Japan loses control of the Tokyo Metropolitan Assembly to the Liberal Democratic Party.
July 21 – 2013 Japanese House of Councillors election, Hyōgo gubernatorial election
August 15 – An explosion at the 2013 Fukuchiyama Firework Festival event kills 3, injures 59.
September 7 – The 125th IOC Session in Buenos Aires, Argentina award the rights to host the 2020 Summer Olympics in Tokyo over Istanbul and Madrid.
September 8 – Ibaraki gubernatorial election – Masaru Hashimoto enters his sixth term as governor.
October 11 – A fire at the Abe Orthopaedic Surgery Hospital in Hakata-ku, Fukuoka kills 10 and injures 5.
October – Typhoon Wipha kills at least 17 people in Ōshima, Tokyo; at the request of governor Naoki Inose, GSDF troops are dispatched. On the mainland, the storm causes major traffic disruptions and kills one woman in Machida, Tokyo.
October 27 – Miyagi gubernatorial election: Incumbent governor Yoshihiro Murai's only challenger is JCP-supported lawyer Masaaki Satō.
November 10 – Hiroshima gubernatorial election – Hidehiko Yuzaki re-elected.
December 6 – Special Secrecy Law passes the National Diet
December 19 – Naoki Inose announces his resignation as Governor of Tokyo following allegations of dubious loans from the Tokushukai medical group

Economy 
 January 1, 2013 – Japan Exchange Group (JPX), the resulting entity of the merger between the holding companies of the Tokyo and Osaka bourses, was launched.
 January 4, 2013 – JPX was listed on the first section of the Tokyo bourse.

Popular culture

Arts and entertainment 

For an overview of anime, see 2013 in anime. For Japanese films first released this year, see the list of Japanese films of 2013. For an overview of manga, see 2013 in manga. For an overview of music, see 2013 in Japanese music. For an overview of television, see 2013 in Japanese television. For the Japanese television dramas that debuted this year, see 2013 Japanese television dramas

Sports 

In athletics, the 2013 Tokyo Marathon was won by Dennis Kimetto (men) and Aberu Kebede (women).

For an overview of association football, see 2013 in Japanese football. For the national team, see Japan national football team in 2013.

In curling, Japan hosted the 2013 Pacific-Asia Junior Curling Championships, won by China (men) and Japan (women).

In figure skating,  Japan hosted the 2013 Four Continents Figure Skating Championships, won by Kevin Reynolds (men's singles), Mao Asada (ladies' singles), Meagan Duhamel and Eric Radford (pair skating) and Meryl Davis and Charlie White (ice dancing). It will also host the 2013 ISU World Team Trophy in Figure Skating.

In motorsport, see 2013 All-Japan Formula Three season, 2013 Super Formula season and 2013 Super GT season.

In rugby union, the 2012–13 Top League was won by Suntory Sungoliath. In the 2013 Japan Sevens, South Africa won the Cup. See also the 49th Japan National University Rugby Championship

In tennis, the 2013 All Japan Indoor Tennis Championships was won by John Millman (singles) and Purav Raja and Divij Sharan (doubles).

Deaths 

January 15 – Nagisa Oshima, director
February 18 – Chieko Honda, voice actress (b. 1963)
April 4 – Noboru Yamaguchi, writer
April 29 – Shinji Maki, comedian
June 12 – Jiroemon Kimura, supercentenarian, oldest man ever, world's oldest living person (b. 1897)
September 2 – Makoto Moroi, composer
 September 19 – Hiroshi Yamauchi, businessman (b. 1927)
October 28 – Tetsuharu Kawakami, baseball player (b. 1920)
November 13 – Chieko Aioi, actress

See also
 2013 in Japanese music
 2013 in Japanese television
 List of Japanese films of 2013

References 

 
Japan
Years of the 21st century in Japan
2010s in Japan